Charles Lemaire may refer to:
Charles LeMaire (1897–1985), American costume designer
Charles Antoine Lemaire (1800–1871), French botanist and botanical author
Charles Lemaire (explorer) (1863–1926), Belgian esperantist and explorer